West Side Historic District is a national historic district located at Shelbyville, Shelby County, Indiana.  The district encompasses 373 contributing buildings and 4 contributing structures in a predominantly residential section of Shelbyville. It developed between about 1853 and the 1939, and includes notable examples of Queen Anne, Colonial Revival, and Stick Style / Eastlake movement style architecture. Located in the district is the separately listed John Hamilton House. Other notable buildings include the Peter Metzger House, Joseph Acre House, Earl Karmire House, Charles Davis House, Charles Birely House, Harry Whitcomb House, First Christian Church (1901), C.H. Campbell House, George McConnell House, First Presbyterian Church (1885), John Randall House (c. 1880), Alfred Major House, Frank C Sheldon House, and Edward Thurston House.

It was listed on the National Register of Historic Places in 1990.

References

Historic districts on the National Register of Historic Places in Indiana
Queen Anne architecture in Indiana
Colonial Revival architecture in Indiana
Buildings and structures in Shelby County, Indiana
National Register of Historic Places in Shelby County, Indiana